Enji (円次, 猿児, 円児 or エンジ) is a masculine Japanese given name. Notable people with the name include:

 Enji Ichikawa (1911 – 1975), Japanese actor. Daisuke Katō is his real name.
, Japanese aircraft pilot
 Enji Takamizawa (1870–1927), Japanese art collector
, Japanese manga artist
, Japanese Zen Buddhist monk, teacher, author, painter and calligrapher

Fictional Characters
, a character from Tokyo Ghoul
, a character from Kamen Rider Zero, though named Arsino Magia
, a character from My Hero Academia also known as Endeavor

Japanese masculine given names